Addie is a feminine given name, a nickname and a surname. It may also refer to:

 Addie, North Carolina, an unincorporated community
 Addie Township, Griggs County, North Dakota
 Lake Addie, Minnesota
 ADDIE Model, a framework that lists generic processes that instructional designers and training developers use

See also
 , a wooden barge used by the US Navy from 1918 to 1919
 Addy (disambiguation)
 Addey (disambiguation)